Peter James O'Brien (June 16, 1867 – June 30, 1937) was a Major League Baseball player. He played in one game for the Washington Nationals in 1887 and 27 games for the Chicago Colts in 1890.

Sources

 Retrosheet page for Pete O'Brien

1867 births
1937 deaths
19th-century baseball players
Baseball players from Illinois
Chicago Colts players
Major League Baseball second basemen
St. Paul Apostles players
Washington Nationals (1886–1889) players
Chicago Whitings players